Rodney Troy McDonald (born 11 April 1992) is an English professional footballer who plays as a defender for  club Crewe Alexandra.

Career

Stoke City
McDonald joined Stoke City's academy from Manchester City's academy in 2005. He became a regular in the club's youth and reserves side but was released in the summer of 2010. In October 2009 he joined Nantwich Town on loan to gain some first team experience. However Stoke recalled McDonald after just one substitute appearance after academy manager Adrian Pennock wanted him to start on his debut.

Oldham Athletic
McDonald signed for Oldham Athletic in early August 2010 after impressing in a series of trial games at the club. He made his debut on 31 August 2010 in a Football League Trophy match against Shrewsbury Town as a 45th-minute substitute.

On 29 October 2010 he joined Stafford Rangers for a month-long loan period to gain some first team experience. He returned to Oldham at the end of November having made four appearances whilst on loan, including three league matches.

On 22 February 2011, McDonald joined Northern Premier club Nantwich Town on a month-long loan deal. The loan was extended on 24 March until the end of the season.

At the end of the season he was informed by Oldham that he was out of contract and would not be offered a new deal.

Colwyn Bay
In July 2011, McDonald agreed to join Colwyn Bay.

Nantwich Town
In late 2011 he rejoined his former loan club, for the third time, this time on a permanent deal.

Hereford United
On 28 January 2013, McDonald joined Hereford United on a contract lasting until the end of the season.

After impressing Hereford manager Martin Foyle, McDonald signed a new one-year contract on 11 June 2013.

AFC Telford United 
Following Hereford's relegation from the Conference Premier Division, McDonald departed the club and signed for AFC Telford United, following Martin Foyle in joining the Bucks.

Northampton Town 
After leaving Telford, McDonald joined Northampton Town on a trial, and impressed manager Chris Wilder enough to earn a 12-month contract with the Cobblers. McDonald made his debut for Northampton in a 3–0 win over Exeter City on 15 August 2015, as a substitute for Zander Diamond. He eventually established himself as a regular starter in the side as they went on to win the 2015/16 League Two title, signing a new contract with the club until the summer of 2018 in February 2016.

Following Chris Wilder's departure as Northampton Town manager in May 2016, McDonald struggled to establish in the side during the following season in League One, making just nine appearances in all competitions during the 2016/17 season. At the end of the campaign, McDonald was transfer-listed by manager Justin Edinburgh, alongside three other players.

Coventry City 
On 19 May 2017, McDonald was signed by Coventry City on a two-year contract for an undisclosed fee. McDonald made his debut for the Sky Blues in a 3–0 victory over Notts County on the opening day of the 2017–18 League Two season.

AFC Wimbledon
On 2 August 2018, McDonald joined League One side AFC Wimbledon for an undisclosed fee.

Carlisle United
On 3 August 2020, McDonald joined Carlisle United on a two-year deal. He was released by the club at the end of the 2021–22 season.

Crewe Alexandra
On 27 June 2022, McDonald agreed to join Crewe Alexandra upon the expiration of his Carlisle United contract. He started in Crewe's opening game of the 2022–23 season, a 2–1 victory over Rochdale at Spotland on 30 July 2022. Five weeks later, on 3 September 2023, he scored his first Crewe goal in a 2–1 League Two defeat by Stevenage at Gresty Road.

Personal life
His father Rodney was a professional footballer for Partick Thistle as well as many other clubs, as is his older brother Clayton.

Career statistics

Honours
Coventry City
EFL League Two play-offs: 2018

References

External links

1992 births
Living people
Stoke City F.C. players
Oldham Athletic A.F.C. players
English Football League players
Stafford Rangers F.C. players
Nantwich Town F.C. players
Colwyn Bay F.C. players
AFC Telford United players
Hereford United F.C. players
Northampton Town F.C. players
Coventry City F.C. players
AFC Wimbledon players
Carlisle United F.C. players
Crewe Alexandra F.C. players
Northern Premier League players
National League (English football) players
Association football defenders
English footballers